The 1971–72 Idaho State Bengals men's basketball team represented Idaho State University during the  NCAA University Division basketball season. Led by first-year head coach Jim Killingsworth, the Bengals played their home games on campus at the ISU Minidome in Pocatello.

The conference tournament debuted four years later, in 1976.

Junior center Ev Fopma was named to the all-conference team; junior guard Edison Hicks was on the second team, while guard Jerry Sabins, forward Mike Solliday, and forward Nick Ysusra were honorable mention.

On Saturday, March 11, the two-year-old Minidome hosted a pair of first-round games in the West regional of the

References

External links
Sports Reference – Idaho State Bengals – 1971–72 basketball season

Idaho State Bengals men's basketball seasons
Idaho State
Idaho State